Frederick or Fred Lewis may refer to:

Sportspeople
Carl Lewis (Frederick Carlton Lewis, born 1961), American track athlete and Olympic medalist
Fred Lewis (born 1980), American baseball player
Fred Lewis (1880s outfielder) (1858–1945), 19th-century American baseball player
Fred Lewis (basketball, born 1921) (1921–1994), college basketball coach
Fred Lewis (footballer, born 1886) (1886–1949), English footballer for Stoke
Fred Lewis (footballer, born 1923) (1923–1975), English footballer for Chelsea and Colchester United
Fred Lewis (handball) (born 1947), American handball player
Freddie Lewis (born 1943), American basketball player who played in the National Basketball Association and American Basketball Association
Frederick Pea (born 1969), American basketball player formerly known as Fred Lewis
Jack Lewis (footballer, born 1948), born Frederick John Lewis, Wales under-23 international footballer

Others
Frederick, Prince of Wales (1707–1751), who was sometimes known by his full name Frederick Louis (or Lewis)
Sir Frederick Orr-Lewis (1860–1921), Canadian businessman
Fred Ewing Lewis (1865–1949), American politician
R. Fred Lewis (born 1947), Chief Justice of the Florida Supreme Court
Frederick M. Lewis, known for his contribution to the Mayo–Lewis equation in polymer chemistry
Frederick Lewis, 1st Baron Essendon (1870–1944), British shipping magnate
Fred P. Lewis, American meteorologist
Frederick Christian Lewis (1779–1856), English etcher, engraver and painter